The French word huissier ("doorman", from huis, an archaic term for a door) designates ceremonial offices in France and Switzerland.

France
In French government ministries and Parliament, a huissier is an employee who provides general service to the minister or assembly (transmitting messages, handling ballot boxes, etc.). Traditionally, they wear a chain around the neck, because their original function was to lock and unlock doors.

Before the Revolution, the title could be a court office in the household of royalty, as a type of valet de chambre.

Switzerland
In Switzerland, huissier is the French equivalent of German Weibel (also Amtsweibel), the term for a ceremonial office in Swiss cantonal and federal governments, parliaments and courts of law. At the federal level, the office is  known as Bundesweibel, at the cantonal level as Standesweibel for governments, Ratsweibel for parliaments and Gerichtsweibel for courts of law. Some cities also have the office at the communal level (Stadtweibel).

Swiss huissiers in their official capacities wear ceremonial robes with the heraldic colours of the entity they represent, Bundesweibel in red and white, cantonal weibel in cantonal colours (Standesfarben).

See also
Aegis
Huissier de justice
Necklet
Chain of office
Doorman
Footman
Usher
Hospitality
Protocol (diplomacy)
Meet and Greet

References
 

Law of France
Swiss culture